M Centauri (M Cen) is a binary star in the constellation Centaurus.  It is approximately 260 light years from Earth.

M Centauri is a yellow G-type giant with an apparent magnitude of +4.64.  It is a spectroscopic binary with an orbital period of 437 days.

References 

Centauri, M
Centaurus (constellation)
Spectroscopic binaries
G-type giants
5172
119834
067234
Durchmusterung objects